Amie Stepanovich is a lawyer specializing in cybersecurity, privacy law and drone surveillance. She is the executive director of Silicon Flatirons, a research center at University of Colorado Boulder.

Education
Stepanovich attended Florida State University where she earned a Bachelor of Science in communications. She received her Juris Doctor degree from New York Law School in May 2010. There, she served as editor-in-chief of the New York Law School Media Law & Policy journal. Upon graduation, she served as a law clerk at the Legal Aid Society, the Media Law Resource Center, and T-Systems North America, Inc. Stepanovich passed the New York State bar examination in July 2010.

Career

Drone Related Advocacy

References

External links
 https://web.archive.org/web/20160311003246/https://www.accessnow.org/author/amie-stepanovich/

New York Law School alumni
Florida State University alumni
American women lawyers
Year of birth missing (living people)
Living people
Place of birth missing (living people)
21st-century American women